María Consuelo Araújo Castro (born 27 October 1971) is a Colombian politician. In 2006, she was appointed minister of foreign relations in the government of President Álvaro Uribe Vélez. She had been minister of culture from 2002 to 2006.

On 19 February 2007, she resigned her ministerial portfolio following the arrest of her brother, Senator Álvaro Araújo Castro, investigated and charged with giving support to paramilitary groups active in the country's ongoing internal conflict. Her father, Álvaro Araújo Noguera was under investigation for the same crimes.

She recommended Fernando Araújo Perdomo (no relation) and he was appointed as new minister by the president.

She has been chief executive officer of Gran Colombia Gold Corp. since 20 August 2010.

References

External links
Presidency of the Republic of Colombia
World Guide to Women Leaders

1971 births
Living people
People from Valledupar
Maria Consuelo
Foreign ministers of Colombia
Colombian Ministers of Culture
Women government ministers of Colombia
Female foreign ministers
21st-century Colombian women politicians
21st-century Colombian politicians
Colombian women diplomats